Gert Johannes Dippenaar (born 16 May 1989) is a Namibian former cricketer.

Dippenaar played a single first-class cricket match for Namibia against Easterns in the 2011–12 CSA 3-Day Cup at Benoni. Batting twice in the match, he scored 21 runs in the Namibian first innings, before being dismissed by Shaun Liebisch, while in their second innings he was dismissed without scoring by Cobus Pienaar. With his leg break bowling, he took figures of 4 for 49 in the Easterns first innings. In the same season he also made two Twenty20 appearances in the CSA Provincial T20 Cup against North West and Easterns. Dippenaar was selected in the initial 18-man squad for the 2012 World Twenty20 Qualifier, but was dropped from the final squad in February 2012.

References

External links

1989 births
Living people
Namibian cricketers